Hans Aardal (6 January 1921 – 3 December 1995) was a Norwegian politician for the Conservative Party.

He served as a deputy representative to the Norwegian Parliament from Sogn og Fjordane during the terms 1965–1969 and 1969–1973.

References

1921 births
1995 deaths
Conservative Party (Norway) politicians
Deputy members of the Storting
Sogn og Fjordane politicians